Katembri–Taruma is a language family proposed by Kaufman (1990) that links two extinct or critically endangered languages of South America:
Katembrí, also known as Mirandela of Bahia State, Brazil, and
Taruma, also known as Taruamá of Brazil and Guyana.

The proposal is not repeated in Campbell (2012).

See also
Kariri languages

References

 Alfred Métraux, 1951, Une nouvelle langue Tapuya de la région de Bahia, (Brésil)

 
Indigenous languages of Western Amazonia
Languages of Brazil
Proposed language families